Robert William Baldridge (26 November 1932 – 2014) was an English footballer who played as a centre forward.

Baldridge started his career with non-league Hendon Social before signing for Gateshead in February 1957. He scored a total of 23 goals in 61 appearances in the league and FA Cup for Gateshead. Baldridge then went on to play non-league football for South Shields.

Baldridge died in Sunderland in 2014, at the age of 81.

References

Sources

1932 births
2014 deaths
English footballers
Association football forwards
Gateshead F.C. players
South Shields F.C. (1936) players
English Football League players